A particulate matter sampler is an instrument for measuring the properties (such as mass concentration or chemical composition) of particulates in the ambient air.

Types

Two different types of particulate matter samplers exist that measure particulate mass concentration: manual samplers and automated samplers.

Manual
Manual samplers draw a known volume of air through a filter.  The filter is weighed on an analytical balance before and after sampling, and the difference in weight divided by the volume of air pulled through the filter gives the mass concentration of the particulate.

Automated
Automated samplers do the weighing in the field. There are two types of automated samplers in common usage: samplers that use a beta gauge for mass measurement and samplers that use a tapered element oscillating microbalance (TEOM) for mass measurement.

Beta gauge
Beta gauge particulate samplers have an appearance that is similar to a reel to reel tape recorder.  Air is pulled through a filter tape to accumulate a sample, the mass of the tape before and after sampling is determined by advancing the tape spot into the beta attenuation cell.

Tapered element oscillating microbalance

The tapered element oscillating microbalance (TEOM) particulate sampler operates by drawing air through a filter attached at the tip of a glass tube.  An electrical circuit places the tube into oscillation, and the resonant frequency of the tube is proportional to the square root of the mass on the filter.

Noise based particle counters

Recently, microphone based instruments have been devised that monitor noise levels in specific frequency bands to predict local PNC levels. Prototypes of such instruments have been tested in Europe and in Bangalore.

Inertial separators
Particles of different sizes have different health effects.  Inertial separators are used to eliminate particles outside of the desired size range.  If a gas stream containing particles of different sizes is forced to turn a sharp corner, the inertia of the large particles causes them to separate from the gas stream lines.  The larger particles can be collected and removed from the gas stream after collisions with the walls of the vessel.

The two common types of inertial separators are cyclones, which spin the gas stream, causing collisions of the heavier particles with the outside of the cyclone wall, and impactors, where the gas particle stream is directed at a greased metal plate and turned at the last moment, causing the larger particles to stick to the greased plate.

Modern particulate samplers use a volumetric flow control system that pulls air through the particle separator at the velocity required to achieve the desired cutpoint.

For air pollution applications, the definition of "particulate" does not include uncombined water, and water from a particulate sample must be removed before it is weighed.  This can be done either by heating the sample to evaporate the water or by placing the sample in a low humidity environment before weighing.

See also
Particle counter

References

Further reading 
NIOSH Manual of Analytical Methods (see chapters on aerosol sampling)

Meteorological instrumentation and equipment
Aerosols